Benz[e]acephenanthrylene is an organic compound with the chemical formula C20H12. It is a polycyclic aromatic hydrocarbon (PAH) made of four benzene rings around a 5-membered ring.

See also
 Benzene
 List of interstellar and circumstellar molecules

References

External links
 
 National Pollutant Inventory - Polycyclic Aromatic Hydrocarbon Fact Sheet

Polycyclic aromatic hydrocarbons
IARC Group 2B carcinogens